The 2019–20 Norfolk State Spartans men's basketball team represent Norfolk State University during the 2019–20 NCAA Division I men's basketball season. The Spartans, led by seventh-year coach Robert Jones, play their home games at the Joseph G. Echols Memorial Hall in Norfolk, Virginia as members of the Mid-Eastern Athletic Conference.

Previous season
The Spartans finished the season 22–14 overall, 14–2 in MEAC play to finish in first place, and win the MEAC regular season championship. As the No. 1 seed in the MEAC tournament, they were upset in the championship game by No. 3 seed North Carolina Central. As a conference champion who failed to win their conference tournament, and not selected to participate in the NCAA tournament, they were awarded an automatic bid to the NIT. Given a No. 8 seed in the Alabama bracket, they upset No. 1 seed Alabama in the first round, then were defeated in the second round by No. 4 seed Colorado.

Roster

Schedule and results

|-
!colspan=9 style=| Non-conference regular season

|-
!colspan=9 style=| MEAC regular season

|-
!colspan=9 style=| MEAC tournament

Schedule Source:

References

Norfolk State Spartans men's basketball seasons
Norfolk State
Norfolk State Spartans
Norfolk State Spartans